Jacques Réattu (3 August 1760, Arles – 7 April 1833, Arles) was a French painter and winner of the grand prix de Rome. He was an illegitimate son of the painter Guillaume de Barrême de Châteaufort and Catherine Raspal, sister of the Arles-born painter Antoine Raspal – Antoine gave him his first lessons in painting.

In Paris, in 1773 he was a pupil of Jean-Antoine Julien, then entered the Academy in 1781, with Michel Francois Dandre-Bardon as a patron, he was a pupil of Jean-Baptiste Regnault. In 1790 he won the Prix de Rome, thanks to a work, currently exhibited at the École nationale supérieure des beaux-arts in Paris, Daniel faisant arrêter les vieillards accusateurs de la chaste Suzanne. Following anti-French riots of the Roman population, he fled to Naples, from where he could return to France. Réattu bequeathed to his hometown many works including an unfinished Death of Alcibiades, which is a testament to his working method. The town of Arles named the Musée Réattu  established at the site of his residence in his honour.

See also
 Montmajour Abbey

References
 Katrin Simons, Jacques Réattu, 1760–1833, Peintre de la Révolution française, Arthéna, Alençon, 1995, 
 Catalogue de l'exposition au Musée de la Révolution française,  Jacques Réattu sous le signe de la Révolution, Actes Sud, Arles, 2000, 
 Katrin Simons, Musée Réattu, catalogue No.2 Jacques Réattu, portrait d'un musée, Musée d'Arles, 1989, ISSN 0982-2291

Further reading

1760 births
1833 deaths
People from Arles
18th-century French painters
French male painters
19th-century French painters
Prix de Rome for painting
19th-century French male artists
18th-century French male artists